The Symphony No. 3 in E-flat major (subtitled First of May), Op. 20 by Dmitri Shostakovich was first performed by the Leningrad Philharmonic Orchestra and Academy Capella Choir under Aleksandr Gauk on 21 January 1930 (the anniversary of Lenin's death).

Similar to the Second Symphony, it is a single movement choral symphony which lasts around 25 to 30 minutes. The finale sets a text by Semyon Isaakovich Kirsanov praising May Day and the October Revolution. In a letter to Boleslav Yavorsky, Shostakovich said that the work "expresses the spirit of peaceful reconstruction.”

Lyrics
On the very first May Day ("the first first of May", in Russian)
a torch was thrown into the past,
a spark, growing into a fire, 
and a flame enveloped the forest. 

With the drooping fir trees' ears
the forest listened 
to the voices and noises 
of the new May Day parade.

Our May Day.
In the whistling of grief's bullets
grasping bayonet and gun, 
the tsar's palace was taken.

The fallen tsar's palace:
this was the dawn of May,
marching ahead,
in the light of grief's banners.

Our May Day:
in the future there will be sails, 
unfurled over the sea of corn,
and the resounding steps of the corps.

New corps, the new ranks of May 
their eyes like fires looking to the future. 
factories and workers
march in the May Day parade.

We will reap the land,
our time has come.
Listen, workers, to the voice of our factories:
in burning down the old, you must kindle a new reality. 

Banners rising like the sun,
march, let your steps resound. 
Every May Day 
is a step towards Socialism.

May Day is the march 
of armed miners.
Into the squares, revolution,
march with a million feet!

Instrumentation
The symphony is scored for mixed chorus and an orchestra of 3 flutes (3rd doubling piccolo), 2 oboes, 2 clarinets, 2 bassoons, 4 horns, 2 trumpets, 3 trombones, tuba, timpani, triangle, snare drum, cymbals, bass drum, tam-tam, glockenspiel, xylophone, and strings.

Notable recordings
Notable recordings of this symphony include:

Source: arkivmusic.com (recommended recordings selected based on critics reviews)

References

Shostakovich 3
Symphony No. 03 (Shostakovich)
Compositions in E-flat major
1930 compositions